Gegeneophis danieli, the Amboli caecilian or Daniel's caecilian, is a species of caecilians in the family Indotyphlidae. It was discovered from near Amboli in Western Ghats of Maharashtra.

References

danieli
Endemic fauna of the Western Ghats
Amphibians of India
Amphibians described in 2003